Under the Bushes Under the Stars is the ninth Guided by Voices album overall, and the last until 2012's Let's Go Eat the Factory to feature the "classic" lineup including Tobin Sprout, Mitch Mitchell, and Kevin Fennell in addition to leader Robert Pollard.   The album is noted as Guided by Voices' first stab at professionalism, being recorded in 24 track studios rather than their customary 4 track. Sessions for the album were reportedly arduous, spread as they were across at least four studios and as many sets of producers, and many titles and configurations were vetted before a final sequence was reached.

The final six tracks on the CD do not appear on the album's back cover.  These tracks, which were included as a separate 12" EP in the vinyl edition, were not originally included in the completed album sequence, having been dropped from earlier proposed versions of the album, but were included at the request of Matador label executives who regretted their exclusion.

Track listing
All songs written by Robert Pollard unless otherwise noted.

Side A
 "Man Called Aerodynamics" – 2:01
 "Rhine Jive Click" – 1:34
 "Cut-Out Witch" – 3:04
 "Burning Flag Birthday Suit" – 2:22
 "The Official Ironmen Rally Song" – 2:48
 "To Remake the Young Flyer" (Tobin Sprout) – 1:43
 "No Sky" – 2:03
 "Bright Paper Werewolves" – 1:14
 "Lord of Overstock" – 2:34

Side B
 "Your Name Is Wild" – 2:01
 "Ghosts of a Different Dream" – 2:30
 "Acorns & Orioles" – 2:12
 "Look at Them" – 2:27
 "The Perfect Life" (Sprout) – 0:59
 "Underwater Explosions" – 2:02
 "Atom Eyes" (Sprout) – 1:42
 "Don't Stop Now" – 2:39
 "Office of Hearts" – 2:06

Side C
 "Big Boring Wedding" – 3:43
 "It's Like Soul Man" (Sprout) – 2:09
 "Drag Days" – 2:50

Side D
 "Sheetkickers" (Jim Pollard, Robert Pollard) – 3:17
 "Redmen and Their Wives" – 3:55
 "Take to the Sky" – 1:50

1998 bonus tracks
 "Finks" – 2:28
 "The Finest Joke Is Upon Us" – 3:09

Personnel

Guided by Voices 

 Robert Pollard – lead vocals, guitar, drums, bass guitar
 Tobin Sprout – bass guitar, guitar
 Kevin Fennell – drums
 James Greer – bass guitar
 Mitch Mitchell – guitar

Additional musicians 

 Tripp Lamkins – guitar
 John Shough – piano
 Shelby Bryant – strings

Technical 

 Mark Ohe – cover artwork
 Robert Pollard – cover artwork
 Greg Calbi – mastering

Notes

A  Tracks "The Official Ironmen Rally Song", "Don't Stop Now", "Big Boring Wedding", "Drag Days" and "Redmen and Their Wives" were produced by Kim Deal.
B  Tracks "It's Like Soul Man" and "Sheet Kickers" were produced by Steve Albini.

References

1996 albums
Guided by Voices albums
Albums produced by Steve Albini
Matador Records albums